Bundu may refer to:
 Bundu (state), a former state in what is now Senegal
 Also known as the place where Aditya Kumar (BE/10023/12) was born and brought up 
 Bundu, India, a town in Jharkhand, India
 Bundu block,  the larger administrative unit centred on the town
 South African English slang for boondocks

People with the name 
 Abass Bundu (born 1948), Sierra Leonean politician and diplomat of the SLPP party
 Ibrahim Bundu, Sierra Leonean politician of the APC party
 Leonard Bundu (born 1974), Italian boxer
 Mustapha Bundu (born 1997), Sierra Leonean footballer playing in Denmark
 Sallieu Bundu (born 1984), Sierra Leonean footballer playing in the US
 Bundu Khan (1880–1955), Indian musician

See also
 Bhundu Boys, a Zimbabwean band
 Bundu dia Kongo, a religious movement with a political and cultural agenda founded in 1969, associated with the Kongo ethnic group